Beethoven was One-Sixteenth Black is a book of short stories by Nadine Gordimer, published by Bloomsbury. Reviewing the collection in The New York Times, Siddhartha Deb said: "As she always has, Gordimer offers her readers a rare combination of intimacy and transcendence". Jonathan Gibbs wrote in The Independent: "In her 84th year, Nadine Gordimer has produced a remarkable 10th collection. They show none of the "audacity" Richard Ford called for in his recent anthology of American short stories. Instead, what they show is tact: a quality that seems bound up in Gordimer's decades of experience. There are stories here that a 30-year-old could not have thought to write, let alone written."

Publication
Many of the stories in the compilation have been published elsewhere and are available online. Some of these are listed below.
"Gregor Revisited" – Guardian, December 4, 2004
"Mother Tongue" – New Statesman, January 1, 2005
"The First Sense" – The New Yorker, December 18, 2006
"A Beneficiary" – The New Yorker, May 21, 2007.

References

2007 short story collections
Short story collections by Nadine Gordimer